European values are the norms and values that Europeans are said to have in common, and which transcend national or state identity.  In addition to helping promote European integration, this doctrine also provides the basis for analyses that characterise European politics, economics, and society as reflecting a shared identity; it is often associated with value of human rights, liberal democracy, and rule of law.

Overview
Especially in France, "the European idea" (l'idée d'Europe) is associated with political values derived from the Age of Enlightenment and the Republicanism growing out of the French Revolution and the Revolutions of 1848 rather than with personal or individual identity formed by culture or ethnicity (let alone a "pan-European" construct including those areas of the continent never affected by 18th-century rationalism or Republicanism).

The phrase "European values" arises as a political neologism in the 1980s in the context of the project of European integration and the future formation of the European Union. The phrase was popularised by the European Values Study, a long-term research program started in 1981, aiming to document the outlook on "basic human values"  in European populations. The project had grown out of a study group on "values and social change in Europe" initiated by Jan Kerkhofs, and Ruud de Moor (Catholic University in Tilburg). The claim that the people of Europe have a distinctive set of political, economic and social norms and values that are gradually replacing national values has also been named "Europeanism" by McCormick (2010).

"European values" were contrasted to non-European values in international relations, especially in the East–West dichotomy, "European values" encompassing individualism and the idea of human rights in contrast to Eastern tendencies of collectivism. However, "European values" were also viewed critically, their "darker" side not necessarily leading to more peaceful outcomes in international relations.

The association of "European values" with European integration as pursued by the European Union came to the fore with the eastern enlargement of the EU in the aftermath of the Cold War.

The Treaty of Lisbon (2007) in article 1A lists a number of "values of the Union", 
including "respect for human dignity, freedom, democracy, equality, the rule of law and respect for human rights including the rights of persons belonging to minorities", invoking "a society in which pluralism, non-discrimination, tolerance, justice, solidarity and equality between women and men prevail".

The 2012 Eurobarometer survey reported that 49% of those surveyed described the EU member states as "close" in terms of "shared values" (down from 54% in 2008), 42% described them as "different" (up from 34% in 2008).

Habermas and Derrida (2005)
The philosophers Jürgen Habermas and Jacques Derrida wrote an article for the newspaper Frankfurter Allgemeine Zeitung in which they claimed the birth of a 'European public sphere'. 
They argued that new values and habits had given contemporary Europe 'its own face', and saw an opportunity for the construction of a 'core Europe' (excluding Britain and Eastern Europe) that might be a counterweight to the United States.

Attempting to explain what Europe represented, the two philosophers listed six facets of what they described as a common European 'political mentality':

 Secularisation.
 Trust in the state and scepticism about the achievements of markets.
 Realistic expectations about technological progress.
 Welfarism.
 A low threshold of tolerance for the use of force.
 Multilateralism within the framework of a reformed United Nations.

McCormick (2010)
Political scientist John McCormick expands on these ideas, and identifies the following as core attributes of Europeanism:

A rethinking of the meaning of citizenship and patriotism. In regard to the latter, pride in country is being replaced with pride in ideas, otherwise known as constitutional patriotism. Identification with nations or states is being increasingly joined with identification with Europe.
 Cosmopolitanism, or an association with universal ideas, and a belief that all Europeans, and possibly even all humans, belong to a single moral community that transcends state boundaries or national identities. The local and the global cannot be separated or divorced.
 Communitarianism, which - in contrast to the liberal emphasis on individual rights - supports a balance between individual and community interests, emphasizing the responsibilities of government to all those who live under its jurisdiction. Europeanism argues that society may sometimes be a better judge of what is good for individuals rather than vice versa.
 The collective society. Europeanism emphasizes the view that societal divisions will occur in spite of attempts to ensure equal opportunity, and accepts the role of the state as an economic manager and as a guarantor of societal welfare.
 Welfarism, or a reference to Europeanist ideas that while individual endeavor is to be welcomed, applauded and rewarded, the community has a responsibility for working to ensure that the playing field is as level as possible, and that opportunity and wealth are equitably distributed. Europeanism emphasizes equality of results over equality of opportunity. 
 Sustainable development, or the belief that development should be sustainable, meeting the needs of the present without compromising the needs of future generations.
 Redefining the family. The place of the European family is changing, with fewer Europeans opting to marry, their ages at marriage rising, their divorce rates growing, their fertility rates declining, more children are being born outside marriage, and single-parent households becoming more usual.
 Working to live. Post-material Europeans are working fewer hours, are doing more with those hours, and have developed family-friendly laws and policies.
 Criminal rights. In matters of criminal justice, Europeanism means a greater emphasis on individual rights, and a preference for resolving disputes through negotiation rather than confrontation through the law. 
 Multiculturalism, in which Europe has a long and often overlooked tradition arising from the diversity of European societies, and a Europeanist habit of integrating core values and features from new groups with which its dominant cultures have come into contact.
 Secularism is probably the one quality most clearly associated with Europe: while religion continues to grow in most of the rest of the world, in virtually every European country, its role is declining, and it plays an increasingly marginal role in politics and public life, while heavily influencing Europeanist attitudes towards science and towards public policies in which religious belief plays a role.
 Opposition to capital punishment. This is prohibited in all European Union and Council of Europe member states, and European governments have worked to achieve a global moratorium as a first step towards its worldwide abolition.
 Perpetual peace. Where once Europe was a region of near constant war, conflict and political violence, it is today a region of generalised peace, and one which has made much progress along the path to achieving the Kantian condition of perpetual peace. Inter-state war in the region is alleged to be unthinkable and impossible, even during the worst economic or financial troubles.
 Multilateralism. Europeanism has eschewed national self-interest in favour of cooperation and consensus, of the promotion of values rather than interests, of reliance on international rules and agreements, and of building coalitions and working through international organisations to resolve problems.

European Union
The European Union declares the fundamental EU values to be the ones "common to the Member States in a society in which pluralism, non-discrimination, tolerance, justice, solidarity and equality between women and men prevail". They are: human dignity, freedom, democracy, equality, rule of law, and human rights. These fundamental values are defined in the Treaty of Lisbon.

See also
 Asian values
 Europhile
 Pan-European identity
 Pro-Europeanism

References

External links
dialogueanduniversalism.eu

Pan-European nationalism
Pro-Europeanism